The Wuhan–Xiaogan intercity railway is an intercity railway connecting Wuhan and Xiaogan. It is a part of Wuhan Metropolitan Area intercity railway. It was opened on December 1, 2016.

References

Transport in Hubei
High-speed railway lines in China
Railway lines opened in 2016
2016 establishments in China
Airport rail links in China